Montussaint is a commune in the Doubs department in the Bourgogne-Franche-Comté region in eastern France.

Geography
The Ognon forms the boundary between the two departments.

Population

See also
 Communes of the Doubs department

References

External links

 Montussaint on the intercommunal Web site of the department 

Communes of Doubs